Beeswax is a 2009 American mumblecore film written and directed by Andrew Bujalski. The film examines a few days in the life of twins, played by real-life sisters Tilly and Maggie Hatcher.

It premiered at the Berlin International Film Festival and had a limited theatrical release in the United States on August 7, 2009.

Cast
 Tilly Hatcher as Jeannie
 Maggie Hatcher as Lauren
 Anne Dodge as Amanda
 Alex Karpovsky as Merrill
 Katy O'Connor as Corinne
 David Zellner as Scott

Critical response

The film opened to positive reviews. Review aggregate Rotten Tomatoes reports that 73% of 45 critics gave the film a positive review, with an average score of 6.7/10. The website reported the critical consensus warned that "Andrew Bujalski's third effort will test the patience of some filmgoers", but lauded the film as "a warm, funny, and honest introduction to the mumblecore movement". Review aggregator Metacritic assigned the film a weighted average score of 70 (out of 100) based on 14 reviews from mainstream critics, considered to be "generally favorable reviews."

Home media
Beeswax was released on DVD by The Cinema Guild on April 6, 2010. In 2020, The Cinema Guild released a remastered version of the film with a new cover design, a booklet of essays by Christopher Terhechte and Kevin Coorigan, and bonus features including a 10 Years Later Q&A with the cast and crew.

References

External links
 
 
 
 
 
 

2009 films
American independent films
2009 independent films
Films about paraplegics or quadriplegics
Mumblecore films
Films shot in 16 mm film
2000s English-language films
2000s American films
Films about disability